Monte Rotondo is a mountain in the department of Haute-Corse on the island of Corsica, France.
At  it is the second highest in Corsica, after Monte Cinto. It is the highest point on the Monte Rotondo massif.

Location

The peak of Monte Rotondo lies on the boundary between the commune of Corte to the north and east and Venaco to the south and west.
It is east of the  Punta Mufrena and northeast of Lac de Battomello.
The mountain lies within and gives its name to the Réserve naturelle du Massif du Monte Ritondu.

Physical

Hiking
A hiking trail to Monte Rotondo from the D623 road is rated moderate, and is in best condition from April to October.
The hike is easy but long, and requires good physical condition.
The trail passes the Lac de l'Oriente.
It passes through a pine forest, maquis shrubland and over bare rocks.
The view from the summit gives a panorama of Corsica, including Cap Corse to the north, Monte Cinto and Paglia Orba just opposite, Monte d'Oro, Monte Renoso, and Monte Incudine to the south, with the sea on the east and west sides of the island.

Gallery

Notes

Sources

Mountains of Haute-Corse